Tekin Sazlog (born 21 March 1976 in Berlin, West Germany) is a Turkish former professional footballer who played as a striker.

Sazlog made ten appearances in the 2. Bundesliga for Tennis Borussia Berlin during his playing career and represented the Turkey national youth team at various levels.

References

External links 
 
 
 

1976 births
Living people
Footballers from Berlin
German people of Turkish descent
Turkish footballers
Turkey youth international footballers
Association football forwards
2. Bundesliga players
Hertha Zehlendorf players
Tennis Borussia Berlin players
FC Oberneuland players
FSV Optik Rathenow players
Rotenburger SV players